In the mythology of the Quechua people of Peru, Amarum is a spirit in the shape of a water boa.

Indigenous peoples in Ecuador
Quechua legendary creatures